This is a list of roads in Mumbai named after people.

References

Mumbai
Roads in Mumbai
Mumbai-related lists
Lists of roads in India